USS Flaherty (DE-135) was an Edsall-class destroyer escort in service with the United States Navy from 1943 to 1946. She was sold for scrap in 1966.

History
The ship was named in honor of Francis Charles Flaherty, who was awarded the Medal of Honor when he sacrificed his life in the Japanese attack on Pearl Harbor 7 December 1941.  When his ship was being abandoned, he remained in a turret holding a flashlight so that all of his men could see their way in order to escape; however, Flaherty did not make it out.

Flaherty was launched 17 January 1943 by Consolidated Steel Corp., Orange, Texas; sponsored by Mrs. J. J. Flaherty, sister-in-law of Ensign Flaherty; and commissioned 26 June 1943.

Battle of the Atlantic
Between 4 September 1943 and 15 February 1944, Flaherty made three voyages from the east coast to Casablanca on convoy escort duty. On the return passage, off Madeira on 9 April, Flaherty fired in the action which sank , for which she shared in the credit with three other escorts and carrier aircraft.

Capture of U-505 

Returning to New York 27 April 1944, Flaherty rejoined the Guadalcanal group at Norfolk, Virginia, 10 May, and 5 days later sailed on a patrol which was to win the task group a Presidential Unit Citation. On 4 June, in a well-planned and executed operation, her group captured intact . The only capture by American forces of a German submarine on the high seas during the war, this dramatic operation provided essential intelligence for future antisubmarine warfare. Flaherty's role during the action was close screening for Guadalcanal, from which the attack and seizure were directed. She returned to New York from this patrol 22 June.

Sinking of U-546 
Between 15 July 1944 and 7 November, Flaherty completed two more hunter-killer patrols with the Guadalcanal group, then served as school ship for the Naval Training Center at Miami, Florida. Training in the Caribbean with carriers followed, until she sailed from Naval Station Mayport, 9 April for Argentia, Newfoundland. This was her base for duty on the barrier line established in the last months of the European phase of the war to prevent desperate U-boats from penetrating the western Atlantic. On 24 April,  was torpedoed while investigating a submarine contact, and Flaherty dashed to rescue her survivors. After three men had been taken on board, Flaherty picked the submarine up by sonar, and moved in to attack. Seven other escorts joined her in the 10-hour hunt, which resulted in forcing  to the surface, where she was sunk by gunfire. She recovered five of the U-boat's survivors, including the commanding officer.
 
Flaherty returned to New York 11 May 1945, and 2 weeks later sailed on convoy escort duty to Le Havre, France, and Southampton, England. She returned to duty guarding carriers training off Norfolk and Charleston, South Carolina, until arriving at Green Cove Springs, Florida, 12 January 1946.

Decommissioning and fate
There she was decommissioned and placed in reserve 17 June 1946. She was struck from the Navy list on 1 April 1965 and sold for scrap on 4 November 1966.

Awards 
In addition to the Presidential Unit Citation, Flaherty received four battle stars for World War II service.

References

External links

 NavSource Online: Destroyer Escort Photo Archive - USS Flaherty (DE-135)

Edsall-class destroyer escorts
World War II frigates and destroyer escorts of the United States
Ships built in Orange, Texas
1943 ships